31 Building (Also known as Samil Building, Korean: 31빌딩) is an office building in Seoul, South Korea. Completed in 1970, the 31 Building was the tallest building in Seoul until 1979, when Lotte Hotel Seoul was completed.

The architect of the 31 Building was Kim Joong-up, a famous architect in South Korea.

It was selected as 'Seoul Future Heritage' because it is considered a valuable building in the history of architecture in Seoul.

References

Skyscraper office buildings in Seoul
Office buildings completed in 1970
1970 establishments in South Korea
20th-century architecture in South Korea